Thioformaldehyde is the organosulfur compound with the formula CH2S.  This compound is very rarely observed because it oligomerizes to 1,3,5-trithiane, which is a stable colorless compound with the same empirical formula.  Despite its instability under normal terrestrial conditions, the molecule has been observed in the interstellar medium and has attracted much attention for its fundamental nature.  The tendency of thioformaldehyde to form chains and rings is a manifestation of the double bond rule.

Although thioformaldehyde tends to oligomerize, many metal complexes are known.  One example is Os(SCH2)(CO)2(PPh3)2.

References

Thioaldehydes